Winnik is a surname. Notable people with the surname include:

 Daniel Winnik (born 1985), Canadian ice hockey player
 Françoise Winnik (1952–2021), French and Canadian chemist

See also
 

Surnames of Polish origin